3C-DFE is a lesser-known psychedelic drug, which is a fluorinated derivative of 3C-E. It was first synthesised by Daniel Trachsel in 2002, and has been reported as showing similar psychedelic activity to related compounds, with a dose range of around 20–40 mg and a duration of approximately 10 hours. Despite its reported psychedelic activity, binding studies in vitro showed 3C-DFE to have a surprisingly weak binding affinity of 2695 nM at 5-HT2A with negligible affinity at 5-HT2C, making it only slightly higher affinity than mescaline, despite its higher potency in vivo.

See also 
 2C-TFE
 Escaline
 DOTFM
 2C-T-21
 2C-T-28
 3C-P
 Trifluoromescaline

References

Mescalines
Entheogens